James M. Hall was a Scottish amateur footballer who played as an inside forward in the Scottish League for Queen's Park. He was capped by Scotland at amateur level.

References 

Scottish footballers
Queen's Park F.C. players
Scottish Football League players
Scotland amateur international footballers
Association football inside forwards
Year of birth missing
Place of birth missing
Year of death missing
Place of death missing